Lam Tin Sau (born 26 September 1963) is a Hong Kong athlete. He competed in the men's high jump at the 1984 Summer Olympics.

References

External links
 

1963 births
Living people
Athletes (track and field) at the 1984 Summer Olympics
Hong Kong male high jumpers
Olympic athletes of Hong Kong
Place of birth missing (living people)